Van Keulenfjorden is a 30 km long fjord on the west coast of Spitsbergen separating Nathorst Land to the north and Wedel Jarlsberg Land to the south. Van Keulenfjorden is separated from Bellsund by Forsbladodden in the north and Richardodden to the south.

History

Whaling occurred here at least as early as 1613, when a little pinnace from St. Jean de Luz was said to have been behind Eders Island (at the mouth of Van Keulenfjorden). Van Keulenfjorden was originally called Sardam (Zaandam) Bay by the Dutch, and is labeled as such on maps from 1620 to 1710, when Cornelis Giles and Outger Rep (c. 1710) added the name Van Keulens baaytje to the anchorage behind Eders Island. The bay was named in honor of their publisher, Gerard van Keulen. William Scoresby (1820), thinking the name applied to the fjord as a whole, labeled it Van Keulens Bay. This mistake has been repeated by map-makers to the present day.

References

Conway, W. M. 1906. No Man's Land: A History of Spitsbergen from Its Discovery in 1596 to the Beginning of the Scientific Exploration of the Country. Cambridge: At the University Press. 
 Norwegian Polar Institute Place Names of Svalbard Database

Fjords of Spitsbergen